Jahurul Islam may refer to:
 Jahurul Islam (cricketer)
 Jahurul Islam (entrepreneur)

See also
 Jahurul Islam Medical College, a private medical school in Bangladesh